Nantou Ancient City Museum is a museum in Nantou, Nanshan District, Shenzhen, Guangdong, China. Built within the former government house of Bao'an County, the museum has two stories and three halls, displaying historical artifacts across the former county. It is opened 09:30-17:30 every day with no admission fee. The museum was opened in September 2004.

Public transport:
Travelers can take bus route 105, bus route 201, etc to go to Nantou ancient city museum

Gallery

References

Nanshan District, Shenzhen
Museums established in 2004
2004 establishments in China
Museums in Shenzhen